Punial State in Pakistan was formerly a princely state (under the British it was a "Special Political District" of the Gilgit Agency and not a Princely State) in the northwest part of the Northern Areas which existed until 1974.  The state bordered the Gilgit Tehsil to the south, the former princely state of Yasin to the west, Ishkoman to the north and Afghanistan (Wakhan Corridor) to the northwest.  The State Had Two Capitals while ruled by two Islamic dynasties from different religious background which included the Katur Dynasty (Sunni) and Aqa Shah Dynasty (Ismaili). The state capital was the town of Sher Qila until 1889, it was soon replaced by the town of Gahkuch , after Aqa Shah Ruler His Highness Aqa Sultan Akbar Shah expanded the States boundaries by forming a small military relief force named the Punial Levi's in 1889. The area of Punial now forms the above named tehsil of Ghizer District.

Punial was an independent principality for several centuries. The British gained control of the area and the neighbouring valleys by mid 19th century followed by a military engagement of severe intensity.  The first Rah of Punial was Isa Bagdur of katur Dynasty, a much disliked ruler, who the local people hated for his bloodiest action at the Siege Of Madoori when he sided with the Dogra Ruler in killing the neighboring people of Yasin at their homeland. He was guilty for killing 2000 local inhabitants of Yasin. The British got the news of this bloody massacre and soon sent a relief force to enter the action. In 1885 a new dynasty emerged within the state and they belonged to the Nizari Ismaili Sect Of Islam. The dynasty was well supported by the British as well as the Ismailis of the Area. This Dynasty was later known in the history as Aqa Shah Dynasty and they named their State as Takht-E-Punial ( The Punial State ). Isa Bagdur got the terrible news of him being disposed by the British when he was in his residence and the story goes,

"He was in his palace (Gahkuch Fort) dealing with his vizier's in the court when a guard rushed into the court and exclaimed, My King! We are about to be attacked by the Britishers, they are coming with a much larger army. My King! You need to leave this place."

Seeing the warning he migrated to Sher Qila leaving behind his people in death, as the British arrived they didn't harmed anyone yet they told the local population that you have been free from the rule of a bloody vampire. God has given his devine favour upon you and has send this Akbar Shah ( His Highness Aqa Akbar Shah, First Ismaili Ruler Of Punial State ) as your Lord (Aqa) to be your Guardian And The Chosen One That God has given his devine favour. Meanwhile, in exile Isa Bagdur was succeeded by his son Akbar Khan, who in 1913 was deposed by the British and replaced by his son, Anwar Khan, succeeded in turn by his son Jan Alam.

Takht E Punial 

The Takht E Punial was the official state name of Punial used by rulers of Aqa Shah Dynasty. Religiously they were from the Nizari Ismaili Sect Of Islam. According to old folklore they had migrated from the town of Altae now known as Altit. Their Forefathers were the heirs of the rulling family of Hunza, but two heirs of the family clashed because of religious indifference. The Youngest One had accepted the Ismaili teachings while the older one was still attached to his forefathers religion. In result the Youngest Son had to leave the town after getting a letter from his closest companion warning him that his Older Brother is planning to kill him and has send a hand full of agents to capture him. Seeing the warning the youngest son planned to move southwards of the state, while being accompanied by his most trusted and loyal companions. He got successful in his mission and had no other choice but to hide his identity among the people to avoid persecution. Later on, he vowed to teach the Ismaili teachings among the people but was little successful in his attempt. News reached his identity had been exposed to the states agents so he decided to move even south of the state and eventually ended reaching the town of Gahkuch in early 19th century. From their he started to preach the Ismaili teachings to the locals and got successful. Later he send a handful of Ismaili Pir's to  neighbouring valleys of Punial and Ishkoman to preach the Ismaili teachings and after a great struggle got little amount of success in his attempt. Later after his death his Son made great friendly relations with the British and eventually got favoured by the British Raj with the title Lord and was given protection by the British.

After the concealment period (1800 to1885 ) two concealed descendants of the dynasty sacrificed their life to preach the Ismaili teachings among the local  people and got popular support by the British as well as the Local People. They had concealed their identity among the people that's why no written records have been found so far. After the Concealment period their descendants openly declared their identity to the people with the help of the British and Their Loyal Supporters which resulted in the establishment of the First Ismaili State in Punial and Gahkuch was chosen as the states capital.

The State Rulers From (1885 until Present):

• His Highness Lord Aqa Sultan Akbar Shah ( Aqa Shah I | 1885 - 1912 )

• His Highness Lord Inayat Wali Shah ( Aqa Shah II | 1912 - 1933 )

• His Highness Lord Lt. Col Mir Ali Shah ( Aqa Shah III | 1933 - 1946 )

• His Highness Lord Lt. Col Amir Hussain ( Aqa Shah IV | 1946 - 1966 )

• His Highness Lord Ismail Shah ( Aqa Shah V | 1966 - 1982)

• His Highness Lord Mayoon Shah ( Aqa Shah VI | 1982–present )

His Highness Lord Mayoon Shah is the current ruler of the Aqa Shah Dynasty, he is known as the Aqa Shah VI. He took the duties as the 6th Lord (Aqa) of the Punial State in 1982 at the age of just 19 years. Earlier 10 years before his succession the rulling system had ended due to Zulfiqar Ali Bhutto's FCR policy, which took away all the authorities of the Royal Families within the Northern Areas of Pakistan. He was able to bring developments in his state by building various schools for the children with the help of Aga Khan Education Services. He made construction projects for safe drinking water supply for his people as well as distribution of Electricity to different houses within the area. He also developed new Roadways with an agreement with the Government Of Pakistan in 2001. During The Kargil War he added the Pakistan Army by sending aids for the soldiers of Northern Light Infantry which helped in boosting their morale, eventually soon after the news of withdrawal of the Pakistan Army from Kargil was made, aids didn't properly arrived to the Soldiers of Pakistan due to sudden changes in the routes. His actions were well recognized by the Government Of Pakistan and was decorated with Hilal E Pakistan for his services in the action. In 2005 he got the news of the birth of his grandson and his future heir in his residence at Aqa Shah Palace at Ayshi Bala. His Royal Highness Lord Prince Sameer Shah was born on 7 September 2005 he was the son of the eldest son of Lord Mayoon Shah, with the Crown Prince's arrival sudden changes were made in the Succession Act. His Royal Highness Lord Prince Sameer Shah was named as the successor after His Highness Lord Mayoon Shah as the future Aqa Shah VII while the father of the Crown Prince will act as King Consort. The Crown Prince is currently handling all the affairs of the state and is also making great development projects for his people with the help of Aga Khan Education Services, Aga Khan Rural Support Programme, Aga Khan Health Services and Aga Khan Trust For Culture. His aim is to provide a great living for his people and to enable much changes in his state as much as possible. His master building project was the construction of Prince Ali Muhammad House in Ayshi Bala which was completed in 2020, the design for the building was graphed by himself and the building served as the personal residence of the Youngest Son of His Highness The Aga Khan IV. In accordance for his devoted services for promoting better life for the people and encouraging development projects within the Northern Areas of Pakistan, The Government Of Islamic Republic Of Pakistan conferred upon him the decoration of  Sitar-e-Pakistan in 2022.

References

Princely states of India
Former subdivisions of Pakistan
Ghizer District
Muslim princely states of India